Cittadellarte is an art and creativity laboratory founded in 1998 by the artist Michelangelo Pistoletto in a disused textile mill by the river Cervo in Biella, Italy.

References
Official site of the Cittadellarte – Fondazione Pistoletto 

Arts organisations based in Italy
1998 establishments in Italy